Tarek Hamed (born 24 October 1988) is an Egyptian professional footballer who plays as a defensive midfielder for Saudi Professional League club Al-Ittihad and the Egyptian national team.

Club career

Smouha 
After signing for Smouha, Hamed was a key player under the management of Hamada Sedki. He succeeded in being a runner-up in both the Egyptian Premier League and Egypt Cup.

Zamalek 
In 2014, Hamed signed for Zamalek where he became a key player, winning ten national and continental competitions.

Al-Ittihad
On 24 July 2022, Hamed joined Saudi Arabian club Al-Ittihad on a two-year deal.

CAF Awards 
Hamed was nominated for the African Player of the Year in 2017 and 2019 and ended up as one of the three finalists at the 2019 CAF Awards for best African-based player.

International career 
Hamed has been capped regularly by the national team, gaining his first cap against Saudi Arabia. 

He started all six of Egypt's matches at the 2017 Africa Cup of Nations, in which Egypt won the silver medal. He also played in all four of Egypt's matches at the 2019 Africa Cup of Nations. 

In May 2018, he was named in Egypt’s preliminary squad for the 2018 World Cup in Russia, where he eventually started all three of Egypt's matches.

Career statistics

International

Honours 

Zamalek
Egyptian Premier League: 2014–15,  2020–21, 2021-22
Egypt Cup: 2015, 2016, 2018, 2019, 2021
Egyptian Super Cup: 2016, 2019
CAF Confederation Cup: 2018–19
CAF Super Cup: 2020
Saudi-Egyptian Super Cup: 2018

Al-Ittihad
Saudi Super Cup: 2022

References

External links 

1988 births
Living people
Egyptian footballers
Egypt international footballers
Association football midfielders
Smouha SC players
Tala'ea El Gaish SC players
Zamalek SC players
Ittihad FC players
2017 Africa Cup of Nations players
Egyptian Premier League players
Saudi Professional League players
Footballers from Cairo
2018 FIFA World Cup players
2019 Africa Cup of Nations players
Egyptian expatriate footballers
Egyptian expatriate sportspeople in Saudi Arabia
Expatriate footballers in Saudi Arabia